Sar Ab (also Romanized as Sar Āb) is a village in Qaleh Hamam Rural District, Salehabad County, Razavi Khorasan Province, Iran. At the 2006 census, its population was 122, in 30 families.

References 

Populated places in   Torbat-e Jam County